The 2008 FIA GT Zolder 2 Hours was the ninth round of the 2008 FIA GT Championship season.  It took place at the Circuit Zolder, Belgium, on 19 October 2008.

Race results
Class winners in bold.  Cars failing to complete 75% of winner's distance marked as Not Classified (NC).

Statistics
 Pole Position – #33 Jetalliance Racing – 1:26.029
 Average Speed –

References

Zolder